Claire Annabel Caroline Grant Duff (25 December 1870 – 12 January 1944) was a poet, writer and high society hostess. She published her memoir A Victorian Childhood in 1932 with Methuen Publishing.

She was the eldest daughter of Sir Mountstuart Grant Duff and Anna Julia Webster. She was the author of A Victorian Childhood, which was published in 1932, under the pen name Annabel Jackson.

In 1894, she married Frederick Huth Jackson, a partner in the private bank, Frederick Huth and Sons. They had one son, Frederick who married Helen Vinogradoff, daughter of the distinguished historian Sir Paul Vinogradoff, and three daughters: Konradin, later Lady Arthur Hobhouse; Anne, later Anne Fremantle; and Claire, later Countess de Loriol Chandieu.

References

 Reviewed in Times Literary Supplement

External links 

1870 births
1944 deaths
20th-century British novelists
20th-century British women writers
British memoirists
Scottish socialites
Scottish women novelists
British women memoirists
Victorian women writers